Jelići may refer to:

 Jelići (Gornji Vakuf), a village in Bosnia and Herzegovina
 Jelići (Višegrad), a village in Bosnia and Herzegovina